The 2022 Folds of Honor QuikTrip 500 was a NASCAR Cup Series race held on March 20, 2022 at Atlanta Motor Speedway in Hampton, Georgia. Contested over 325 laps on the 1.54-mile-long (2.48 km) asphalt quad-oval intermediate speedway, it was the fifth race of the 2022 NASCAR Cup Series season.

Report

Background

Atlanta Motor Speedway (formerly Atlanta International Raceway) is a track in Hampton, Georgia, 20 miles (32 km) south of Atlanta. It is a  quad-oval track with a seating capacity of 111,000. It opened in 1960 as a  standard oval. In 1994, 46 condominiums were built over the northeastern side of the track. In 1997, to standardize the track with Speedway Motorsports' other two  ovals, the entire track was almost completely rebuilt. The frontstretch and backstretch were swapped, and the configuration of the track was changed from oval to quad-oval. The project made the track one of the fastest on the NASCAR circuit.

Entry list
 (R) denotes rookie driver.
 (i) denotes driver who is ineligible for series driver points.

Practice

Friday's practice session was canceled due to inclement weather. Practice replaced qualifying Saturday.

Practice results

Qualifying
Qualifying was cancelled because of a need to add additional practice to the reconfigured circuit.  Chase Briscoe was awarded the pole for the race as a result of the pandemic formula with a score of 2.850.

Starting Lineup

Race

Stage Results

Stage One
Laps: 105

Stage Two
Laps: 105

Final Stage Results

Stage Three
Laps: 115

Race statistics
 Lead changes: 46 among 20 different drivers
 Cautions/Laps: 11 for 65
 Red flags: 0
 Time of race: 3 hours, 57 minutes and 14 seconds
 Average speed:

Post-race

Brad Keselowski, who finished 12th, was penalized 100 playoff points when an illegally modified body part was found on his car during a post-race inspection.  In addition, Matt McCall, his crew chief, was fined $100,000 and suspended for the next four races.  The penalty dropped Keselowski from 6th in the point standings to 35th.

Media

Television
The Folds of Honor QuikTrip 500 was carried by Fox in the United States. Mike Joy, Clint Bowyer, and five-time Atlanta winner Jeff Gordon called the race from the broadcast booth. Jamie Little and Regan Smith handled pit road for the television side, and Larry McReynolds provided insight from the Fox Sports studio in Charlotte.

Radio
The race was broadcast on radio by the Performance Racing Network and simulcast on Sirius XM NASCAR Radio. Doug Rice and Mark Garrow called the race from the booth when the field raced down the front stretch. Rob Albright called the race from atop a billboard outside of turn 2 when the field raced through turns 1 and 2, and Pat Patterson called the race from a billboard outside of turn 3 when the field raced through turns 3 and 4. On pit road, PRN was manned by Brad Gillie, Doug Turnbull, and Wendy Venturini.

Standings after the race

Drivers' Championship standings

Manufacturers' Championship standings

Note: Only the first 16 positions are included for the driver standings.

Notes

References

2022 in sports in Georgia (U.S. state)
2022 NASCAR Cup Series
Folds of Honor QuikTrip 500
NASCAR races at Atlanta Motor Speedway